The map-winged swift (Pharmacis fusconebulosa) is a moth belonging to the family Hepialidae and has a patchy distribution throughout Eurasia. The species was first described by Charles De Geer in 1778. It was previously placed in the genus Hepialus and some references still place it there.

Descrlption
This moth gets its common name from the variegated pattern of the forewing, in various shades of black, brown and white, which look rather like a map (although there are plainer forms). Unlike most hepialids, the pattern is rather similar in both sexes although the female is usually rather larger with a wingspan of up to 50 mm.

The adult flies from May to July (August in the north of the range) and is attracted to light, sometimes strongly so. This species overwinters twice as a larva. This moth is strongly associated with bracken (Pteridium spp.) and it is most frequently encountered in habitats where this plant occurs (e.g. moorland, heathland, open woodland). However the larva, which is a root-feeder, has been recorded on other ferns such as Polystichum, grasses such as red fescue and also on potatoes and probably will feed on a wide range of other plants.

Larvae
Eggs are randomly scattered by the flying female, amongst the foodplant. The larvae have a yellowish-white body with a reddish- or purplish-brown head; thoracic plates are orange as is  the body warts which have a short bristle and the spiracles are black. They are subterranean, feeding on the roots and lower stem of the foodplant, and take two years before they pupate. When fully fed they are 30–35 mm long.

Etymology
The species was first described by the Swedish industrialist and entomologist, Charles De Geer in 1778, from the type specimen found in Houblon, France. Previously placed in the genus Hepialus – from the Greek; hēpialos – meaning a fever, as in 'the fitful, alternating flight' of the moth. It has since been allocated to the genus Pharmacis. The specific name fusconebulosa – is from fuscus meaning dark and nebulosus – cloudy, referring to the dark markings on the forewing of certain forms of the moth. A subspecies shetlanicus, refers to the Shetland Islands where the subspecies is found.

Gallery

Notes
  The flight season refers to the British Isles. This may vary in other parts of the range.

References

External links

Pharmacis fusconebulosa at HOSTS (Caterpillar Hostplants Database) Note this link seems not to be working, as of 28 June 2020
Korscheltellus fusconebulosa at Lepiforum e.V.

Hepialidae
Moths described in 1778
Moths of Asia
Moths of Europe
Taxa named by Charles De Geer